"The Ages of Apocalypse" is a series of sub-chapters to Marvel Comics' "The Twelve" saga, wherein En Sabah Nur finds himself trapped in the body of Scott Summers (Cyclops of X-Men) after a failed attempt to possess Nate Grey.  Using his newfound powers, Apocalypse warps reality several times, trying to get the Twelve to feed him more and more power.  "The Ages of Apocalypse" arc is mainly an exploration of the trapped heroes finding a way out of those alternative reality warps.

Characters

Reading order 
Part 1 – Uncanny X-Men #378 – Back in the Past, Gambit and Storm replace Cyclops and Angel in the original X-Men.
Part 2 – Cable #77 – Cable is the leader of an opposition group based in Egypt.
Part 3 – Wolverine #148 – Wolverine, Ghost Rider, Peter Parker and Hulk are the Fantastic Four.
Part 4 – X-Men Unlimited #26 – In the near future, the aged X-Men face an attack by the Sh'iar Empire.
Part 5 – X-Men #98 – Far in the future, the X-Men now come from many different worlds.

Collected editions
The story has been collected into trade paperback and hardcover:

References 

Milleniumcyke and Peter Luzifer. "Ages of Apocalypse". Retrieved April 14, 2006.

External links 
 Alternity
 UncannyXmen.Net's look at Ages of Apocalypse